Abramtsevo is a rural locality (a village) in Sinkovskoye Rural Settlement of Dmitrovsky District, Moscow Oblast, Russia. The population was 15 as of 2010.

Geography 
Abramtsevo is located 25 km northwest of Dmitrov (the district's administrative centre) by road. Miklyayevo is the nearest rural locality.

References 

Rural localities in Moscow Oblast